Langfeld is a surname. Notable people with the surname include:

 Herbert Langfeld (1879–1958), American psychologist
 Josh Langfeld (born 1977), American ice hockey player
 Julius Langfeld (born 1995), German footballer

See also
 Langfeldt
 Langfield